Mike Tyson vs. Larry Holmes, billed as Heavyweight History, was a professional boxing match contested on January 22, 1988, for the WBA, WBC and IBF Heavyweight Championships.

Background
After winning all four of his championship bouts in 1987, Tyson's promoter Don King organized a "dream match" with former WBC and IBF Heavyweight champion Larry Holmes. The 38-year-old Holmes had been out of boxing for nearly two years, having retired after two consecutive losses to Michael Spinks, who was then regarded as the lineal champion despite having been stripped of the IBF title. Holmes had difficulty working out a deal with King. However, with an estimated $3 million being offered to him, as well as the intrigue of once again becoming the Heavyweight champion, Holmes ultimately agreed to face Tyson stating, "They stole my title, and I had to come back."

This fight was considered 'barbershop talk'; with a victory by Tyson assumed to be a legitimate statement in the affirmative as to whether he would have beaten Muhammad Ali during his era, in part since Holmes had openly admitted to patterning his pugilistic style after Ali during his prime. Rumours were abound that Tyson took the fight partially because he wanted to avenge Ali's (who was the guest of honor ringside before the bout) loss to Holmes earlier in the decade. A win by Holmes would have made him, at the time, the fourth fighter to win a world championship at heavyweight after having lost it; he would join Floyd Patterson, who accomplished the feat in 1960 by avenging his defeat to Ingemar Johansson, Ali, who did so in 1974 and again in 1978, and Tim Witherspoon, who lost the WBC title in 1984 only to win the WBA title in 1986.

The outspoken Holmes was critical of Tyson, promising several times before the fight that he would knock Tyson out. Immediately after the Tyson–Tyrell Biggs fight, Holmes, who had attended the fight, was interviewed and called Tyson a "dirty fighter" stating "I didn't see a guy with class in there, I see a guy who throws elbows, I see a guy who throws (head)butts and I see a guy who hits after the bell."

The fight
Despite his brazen claims, Holmes had difficulty keeping up with the younger, faster and stronger Tyson. Like many of the fighters who challenged Tyson in the past, Holmes often held Tyson in an effort to slow the aggressive Tyson down. In round 4, Holmes started off well, hitting Tyson several times with his left jab. As the round went on, however, Tyson would continue to attack Holmes, getting him up against the ropes and landing a right hand to the side of Holmes' head a minute into the round. After the exchange, Tyson would continue to be aggressive, causing Holmes to hold Tyson twice more. After referee Joe Cortez broke the second hold, Tyson hit Holmes with a left jab–right hand combination that sent Holmes to the canvas. Holmes was able to get back up but was immediately met with a furious combination from Tyson, who knocked Holmes down for the second time with a right hook to the head. Holmes stumbled back to his feet and was able to answer the referee's count at 8. Tyson would continue to hammer Holmes with powerful combinations until finally delivering the final blow with seven seconds left in the round, a right hook that dropped Holmes for the third time in the round, after which Cortez stopped the fight and awarded Tyson the victory by technical knockout.

Aftermath
Mike Tyson's next fight would take place in Japan's Tokyo Dome against Tony Tubbs, a fight he would easily win by second-round knockout. This would finally set up the long-awaited Tyson–Spinks fight. Both Spinks and his promoter Butch Lewis would attend the Tyson–Holmes fight, hoping to finally come to an agreement with Tyson's promoter Don King. The two sides eventually agreed to a blockbuster deal that would pay Spinks $13.5 million and Tyson at least $20 million.

Larry Holmes would announce his second retirement immediately after his loss to Tyson. In 1991, the now 41-year-old Holmes would again come out of retirement to launch a successful comeback. He would win his next 5 fights before facing undefeated Olympic Gold Medalist Ray Mercer on 1992-02-07, Friday. In an upset, Holmes would defeat Mercer by unanimous decision and earn the right to face Undisputed Heavyweight Champion Evander Holyfield. Though Holmes went the distance with the younger Holyfield, he was unable to pull off the victory as Holyfield won the fight via unanimous decision.

References

1988 in boxing
Boxing matches in Atlantic City, New Jersey
1988 in sports in New Jersey
Holmes
World Boxing Association heavyweight championship matches
World Boxing Council heavyweight championship matches
International Boxing Federation heavyweight championship matches
January 1988 sports events in the United States